Minuscule 832 (in the Gregory-Aland numbering), A127 (von Soden), is a 10th-century Greek minuscule manuscript of the New Testament on parchment. The manuscript has no complex contents.

Description 
The codex contains the text of the Gospel of Matthew, Gospel of John, and Catholic epistles, on 251 parchment leaves (size ). The text is written in two columns per page, 37 lines per page.
It has some lacunae (in Luke and Jude 3-25).

It contains a commentary to the Catholic epistles.

Text 

Kurt Aland the Greek text of the codex did not place in any Category.

It was not examined by Claremont Profile Method.

History 

Gregory dated the manuscript to the 10th century. Currently the manuscript is dated by the INTF to the 10th century.

The manuscript was examined and described by Angelo Maria Bandini.

Formerly it was designated by 832e and 143a. It was added to the list of New Testament manuscripts by Gregory (832e). Gregory saw it in 1886.

Currently the manuscript is housed at the Laurentian Library (Plutei VI. 5), in Florence.

See also 

 List of New Testament minuscules
 Biblical manuscript
 Textual criticism
 Minuscule 833

References

Further reading 

 
 Angelo Bandini, Catalogus codicum manuscriptorum graecorum, latinorum, italicorum etc, Bibliothecae Mediceae Laurentianae (Florence 1767-1778), p. 100.

External links 
 Biblioteca Medicea Laurenziana Catalogo Aperto
 Images at the Biblioteca Medicea Laurenziana

Greek New Testament minuscules
10th-century biblical manuscripts